Selwyn College Boat Club (SCBC)  is the official rowing club for members of Selwyn College, Cambridge, a constituent college of the University of Cambridge. The Selwyn College Boat Club has one of the highest participation rates of novice rowers of any Oxbridge college, and has performed well in the May Bumps and Lent Bumps in recent years. Notable alumni of the Selwyn College Boat Club include Hugh Laurie, Tom Hollander, and Richard Budgett.

In 2014, Selwyn College constructed a new combined boathouse on the River Cam. The new facility provides training and rowing facilities for members of Selwyn and the University of Cambridge. The combined boathouse was designed by RHP Architects at a cost of approximately £2.20 million and was the winner of the 2017 RIBA East Award for outstanding architecture. Selwyn College rowers have not taken a headship (men's or women's) of the two bumps races. The Selwyn College lower boats have had more success over the past several years, with the 3rd Men's VIII earned blades in both 2006 bumps, and more recently the 1st Women's VIII earned blades in the 2009 Lent Bumps.

History

Selwyn College, Cambridge was named for Bishop George Augustus Selwyn, who was himself a Cambridge scholar and a rower for St John's College, Cambridge. Selwyn is the only College to be named after a scholar who was also a Rowing Blue. George Selwyn was a member of the Cambridge crew which competed in the inaugural Boat Race in 1829.

Despite being an underdog going up against larger and wealthier Oxbridge colleges, Selwyn College Boat Club has always relied heavily on training up novices to be outstanding oarsmen. In the early days of the Lent and May Bumps, Selwyn spent a lot of time in the 2nd division, but rose sharply from the mid-1920s, reaching 3rd in the May Bumps throughout the early 1930s and 2nd in the Lent Bumps in 1933. By 1958, Selwyn's 1st VIII had found its way back into the 2nd division. Selwyn once again gained 2nd place in the Lent Bumps in 1974 and 4th in the May Bumps in 1979, but has since fallen. The men's 1st VIII currently lies 7th in the 2nd Division of Lent Bumps, and 10th in the 1st Division in the May Bumps.

A women's crew first appeared in 1977. The women's 1st VIII reached 3rd in the Lent Bumps by 1981 and the 1st women's IV reached 6th in the May Bumps in 1979. Since then, the most successful season was May Bumps 2016, when their men's 1st VIII achieved super-blades and went up 6 places.

A history of the Selwyn College Boat Club has been published by Dr A. P. McEldowney, a former student and rowing blue of the college. The book traces the complete history of the college rowing club beginning with its origins in Michaelmas term 1883. The SCBC was established immediately after the May Bumps were moved to June, instead of the previous month (1882). It is unknown why this was done, but it is believed to pay homage to the Cambridge tradition of scholars publishing during the Lent Term.

In the late 1990s the college digitised and released the Personal History of the Selwyn College Boat Club through its website. Hard copies of the original remain rare, however a signed original version of the monograph remains in the Selwyn College archives.

Boathouse

The Selwyn College Boat Club moved into its first boathouse during Michaelmas 1883. The old boat house was originally rented from the town-rowing club and later purchased. It was a beautiful but cluttered old building made from shaped wood and iron with no access to the road. Given that all material and supplies had to carried in or taken by coat, it fell into a state of serious disrepair. Nevertheless, young Selwyn men produced a fine tradition of rowing from this humble boathouse, and Selwynites continued to fall in love with its ramshackle quality. The old town boathouse also produced team which achieved a second in the Lent Bumps of 1934 and third in the May Bumps 1931. An impressive result, all the more because of the facilities the rowers had to train in. The Selwyn Boat Club during this period also trained several men who would go on to become Olympic Rowers and University Blues in the annual boat race against Oxford. This was all the more fitting given that the  namesake of the college, George Selwyn, had rowed for the Cambridge team that went up against Oxford in the first Boat Race at Henley-on-Thames in 1829.

Despite these early successes, the fellows of the college eventually decided that the Boat Club should move to a new, more adequately equipped facility. This became a reality in the 1960s when one of the college's benefactors stepped forward and donated funds that allowed Selwyn College to join with King's College, and Churchill College to build a new combined boathouse. In 1968, the combined boathouse opened on the River Cam to great fanfare as the three colleges, plus the Leys School, celebrated their new facilities. This new combined boathouse was somewhat further away from Selwyn and King's, being located on the north end of the River Cam near Jesus Green. Nevertheless, the combined boathouse proved to be a major advantage for the Selwyn College Boat Club which was finally able to properly train and exercise inside its doors. The boathouse contained boat bays for each respective college and back right onto the river.

In 2014, Selwyn College, King's College and Churchill College announced plans for a new, state-of-the-art combined boathouse located on the River Cam, near to the majority of the colleges. The college features double-length beams and extensive gym and training facilities for all Selwyn College rowers and student athletes. This facility was officially completed in 2015-16 and now provides world class rowing and training facilities for Selwyn College Boat Club rowers and students across the University of Cambridge. The project was largely funded by donations and contributions from alumni and the Hermes Club.

The two-storey combined boathouse is larger than its 1968 predecessor and provides facilities for socialising, training, and boat maintenance in addition to an observation deck. The combined boathouse was designed by RHP Architects at a cost of approximately £2.20 million and was the winner of the 2017 RIBA East Award for outstanding architecture.

Hermes Club

The Hermes Club, founded in 1920, exists to encourage and improve rowing and all sports at Selwyn College. Officially, the Hermes Club does not favour any particular sport club, however its board has largely been made up of former rowers of the college since the early 1950s. Each year, the Club offers financial grants to individual sportsmen/women and college teams, through the lobbying of College and raising donations from alumni and foreign donors. Members of the Selwyn College Boat Club are eligible for invitation to the Hermes Club only if they have been awarded a Full Blue or Half Blue by the University, if they have captained a Selwyn College team in a 'First Class sport', or if they have competed on behalf of Selwyn in two 'First Class' Cuppers competitions.

Alumni of the Hermes club fund two major sports grant schemes which award thousands of pounds in grants every year. In particular, the Hermes Fund and the Vickerstaff Sports Bursary Scheme provide funding for outstanding athletes and student scholars who would not otherwise be able to take up their sports at Selwyn College. The Hermes Club also assists the college in raising funds for capital and building projects, including the construction of the 2014 Combined Boathouse.

Honours

Henley Royal Regatta

Gallery

References

 A Personal History of the Selwyn College Boat Club, Andrew Patrick McEldowney

External links
Selwyn College Boat Club

Boat
Rowing clubs of the University of Cambridge
1882 establishments in England
Sports clubs established in 1882
Rowing clubs in Cambridgeshire
Rowing clubs in England
Rowing clubs of the River Cam